Wingless Angels is an album released in 1975 and it is the eighth album by folk musician John Stewart, former member of the Kingston Trio.

Track listing
All compositions by John Stewart except where noted.

Side one
 "Hung on the Heart (Of a Man Back Home)" – 3:53
 "Rose Water" – 3:11
 "Wingless Angels/Survivors II" (John Stewart, Michael Cannon/John Stewart) – 5:25
 "Some Kind of Love" – 3:56
 "Survivors" – 4:02
Side two
 "Summer Child" (John Stewart, Michael Cannon) – 4:51
 "Josie" – 2:57
 "Ride Stone Blind" – 4:33
 "Mazatlan/Adelita" (John Stewart/Public Domain) – 4:11
 "Let the Big Horse Run" – 3:49

Personnel
 John Stewart – electric guitar, acoustic guitar
 Joe Osborn - bass
 Ron Tutt - drums
 Peter Jameson - guitar
 Waddy Wachtel - electric guitar, slide guitar
 Tom Keene - piano, Fender Rhodes
 Dan Dugmore - pedal steel
 Arnie Moore - bass on "Let The Big Horse Run"
 Jonathan Douglas - piano on "Some Kind Of Love"
 Russ Kunkel - drums on "Some Kind Of Love"
 Mike Settle - background vocals
 Denny Brooks - background vocals
 Stephanie Ford - background vocals
 Daniel Moore - background vocals
 Marti McCall - background vocals
 Jackie Ward - background vocals
 Lisa Freeman Roberts - background vocals

Additional personnel
 Nikolas Venet - producer
 Perry Botkin, Jr. - string arrangements, conductor
 Pete Abbott - recording engineer
 Andy McDonald - second
 Sergio Reyes - second
 Henry Diltz - photos
 Frank Murvey - art direction
 Gary Burdon - art direction
 Gribbitt - graphics
 Dave Guard - arrangements on "Ride Stone Blind"
 Mike Settle - vocal arrangements on "Let The Big Horse Run"
 Jon Douglas - arrangements on "Some Kind Of Love"
 John Denver - Backing vocals on "Survivors"

References

1975 albums
John Stewart (musician) albums
Albums arranged by Perry Botkin Jr.
Albums produced by Nick Venet
RCA Records albums